The 2001 Copa AT&T was a men's tennis tournament played on outdoor clay courts at the Buenos Aires Lawn Tennis Club in Buenos Aires, Argentina that was part of the International Series of the 2001 ATP Tour. The tournament ran from 19 February through 25 February 2001. First-seeded Gustavo Kuerten won the singles title.

Finals

Singles

 Gustavo Kuerten defeated  José Acasuso 6–1, 6–3
 It was Kuerten's 1st title of the year and the 18th of his career.

Doubles

 Lucas Arnold /  Tomás Carbonell defeated  Mariano Hood /  Sebastián Prieto 5–7, 7–5, 7–6(7–5)
 It was Arnold's 2nd title of the year and the 8th of his career. It was Carbonell's 2nd title of the year and the 23rd of his career.

References

External links
 Official website 
 ATP tournament profile

Copa TandT
ATP Buenos Aires
Copa TandT
February 2001 sports events in South America